"Bad Girl Good Girl" is a song recorded by K-pop girl group Miss A for their debut EP Bad But Good. The song served as the group's debut single in June 2010. "Bad Girl Good Girl" became an instant commercial success in South Korea, topping the Gaon Digital Chart.

Release 
On June 30, 2010, both "Bad Girl Good Girl" and their first EP Bad But Good were released.

Music video 
On June 30, 2010, the music video for the song was released online. The music video features the girls in a school, dancing in sync.

Performances 
The group had their debut performance on July 1, 2010, with "Bad Girl Good Girl" on M.net M! Countdown. They were number one for the first time on M! Countdown on July 22. Miss A became number one again on KBS Music Bank the following day on July 23 and on SBS Inkigayo on August 1. "Bad Girl Good Girl" was awarded Song of The Month on Cyworld, one of the biggest Korean music portals.

Accolades

Charts

Weekly charts

Year-end charts

Sales

References 
	

	

2010 singles
Miss A songs
Korean-language songs
Gaon Digital Chart number-one singles
Songs written by Park Jin-young
2010 songs
JYP Entertainment singles
Kakao M singles